The General Staff of the Defense Forces of Georgia is the chief military staff of the Defense Forces of Georgia. It is a structural subunit of the Ministry of Defense of Georgia and reports to the Minister of Defense and the Chief of Defense Forces of Georgia. The General Staff's principal responsibility is to aid the Chief of Defense in their various tasks of military management and operational control of the Defense Forces. The General Staff is headed by the Chief of General Staff of Georgian Defense Forces, who is an ex officio Deputy Chief of the Defense Forces. They are appointed by the Minister of Defense of Georgia.

History 
The position of the General Staff of the Armed Forces of Georgia was introduced in 1991. It was named General Staff of Georgian Armed Forces until 2008, Joint Staff of Georgian Armed Forces from 2008 to 2013, again General Staff of Georgian Armed Forces from to 2018, when the current naming—General Staff of the Defense Forces—was adopted.

Functions 
The General Staff of the Defense Forces of Georgia is principally tasked with aiding the Chief of Defense Forces of Georgia in their various functions. The General Staff is, thus, responsible for:
 participation in planning of defense policy and assessing military threats,
 development of the command structure,
 establishment of a plan of recruitment and schedule for recruits,
 regulation of training of the military,
 planning education and training,
 other tasks determined by military law.

Structure 
The General Staff includes the following structural subdivisions:
 J-1 Department of Human Resources
 J-2 Intelligence Department 
 J-3 Department of Operational Planning
 J-4 Department of Logistical Planning
 J-5 Department of Strategic Planning
 J-6 Department of Communications and Information Systems
 J-7 Department of Education and Combat Training
 Administration Department 
 Directorate of Monitoring Combat Readiness
 Directorate of Arms Control and Verification
 Medical Department
 Center for Control of Military Personnel
 Center for Communications
 Information Technologies Service

References 

Staff (military)
Military of Georgia (country)